Margaret Ruth Peacocke (born 1930), also known as Meg Peacocke, is an English poet.

Life
Peacocke was born Margaret Ruth Bennett in Reading, Berkshire to Joan Esther, née Spink (1901–1983) and (Harry) Rodney Bennett (1890–1948), a children's author and lyricist. She had an elder sister Anne (b.1926) and younger brother, the composer Richard Rodney Bennett (19362012), with whom she collaborated on a number of vocal and choral works, starting in the 1980s. She grew up in South Devon and she studied English at St Anne's College, Oxford. 

In 1958, she married Gerald S. P. Peacocke, although they have since divorced. She has four children: Tamsin Peacocke, who has four children; Tully Peacocke; Barnaby Peacocke, who has two children; and Harriet Peacocke, who also has two children.

Awards
 Cholmondeley Award 2005

Works

  Out of print.
 
  Reprinted 2004, 2005, 2012.

References

1930 births
People from Reading, Berkshire
Living people
English women poets
Alumni of St Anne's College, Oxford